Lake Nemrut is a freshwater crater lake in Bitlis Province, eastern Turkey. It is part of Nemrut Caldera, a volcanic caldera atop Volcano Nemrut. The government of Turkey has named as its 14th Wetland of International Importance the Nemrut Caldera (Nemrut Kalderasi) (4,589 hectares, 38°37’10”N 042°13’54”E). With its structural morphology that is unique in Turkey, the site qualifies for the Ramsar List under Criterion 1 on "representative, rare, or unique examples of a natural or near-natural wetland type found within the appropriate biogeographic region".

Caldera

The caldera is located west of Lake Van in the Tatvan, Ahlat and Güroymak districts of Bitlis Province. It is named after the biblical figure King Nimrod. The western half of the crater is covered by the lake. At the summit, there are five lakes, two of them existing permanently and the others seasonal. The biggest of the lakes is Lake Nemrut in the form of crescent. It contains freshwater of colorless, odorless and drink water quality.

Nemrut Caldera is on the youngest volcanic cone in Turkey, which is in a not-eroded state. This unique structural geomorphology make it a subject of scientific research.

Biota

Flora
About 450 plant species were recorded in and around Nemrut Caldera, around 200 (44%) of them belonging to the region. The diversity of the flora points out to the variation of climate conditions in the past. Around 38 (8.4%) of the existing plant species are endemic. The upside down tulip, which grows here, is a world-famous flower. The climax vegetation of Nemrut Caldera forms the haired birch (Betula) and the trembling aspen (Populus tremula). Other notable plants growing around two lakes of the caldera are the trees dwarf juniper (Juniperus communis), Norway maple (Acer platanoides), European mountain ash (Sorbus aucuparia), common buckthorn  (Rhamnus cathartica), sessile oak (Quercus petraea), pedunculate oak (Quercus robur), white willow (Salix alba), and the shrubs coinwort cotoneaster (Cotoneaster nummularius), cherry plum (Prunus divaricata), grey willow (Salix cinerea), Greek juniper (Juniperus excelsa), breaking buckthorn (Frangula alnus), alder buckthorn (Frangula alnus) and mahaleb cherry (Prunus mahaleb). Steppe-like vegetation is spread over wide areas in the caldera. Those are mainly species of milkvetch (Astragalus). Other subshrubs and herbaceous plants  are prickly thrift (Acantholimon), sainfoin (Onobrychis), sheep's sorrel (Rumex acetosella), Thymus, Alyssum, sheep's fescue (Festuca ovina), Salvia, Ranunculus, Silene, rabbitfoot clover (Trifolium arvense), Pimpinella, Artemisia, squarrose  (Centaurea triumfettii). Reedy areas are present In the northwestern part of Lake Nemrıt.

Fauna
The griffon vulture brood their eggs at the caldera, which earned its status of special protected area as habitat for breeding of velvet duck and golden eagle. The number of bird species decreased at Lake Nemrut, which is a stopover site for a lot of migrating birds, due to irregular and uncontrolled hunting. Currently, observed animals in the region are the bird species partridge, duck, bee-eater, Armenian gull and mammals hare, fox, bear. The chamois has been extinct.

Natural monument and Ramsar site
The caldera was registered a natural monument in 2003. Nemrut Caldera Natural Monument is protected in the status of a tourist attraction, a protected area of first degree and a wetland.

The government of Turkey designated the wetland of the caldera as the 14th Ramsar site of the country on April 17, 2013.

It is not permitted to cut reed in the caldera and to fish in the lake, although some livestock grazing takes place around the caldera. A winter sports and ski center was established on the southern slope of the caldera in 2007. The main threat in terms of ecology is overgrazing.

References

External links

Awarded "EDEN – European Destinations of Excellence" non traditional tourist destination 2010

Nemrut
Nemrut
Calderas of Turkey
Landforms of Bitlis Province
Natural monuments of Turkey
Protected areas established in 2003
2003 establishments in Turkey
Ramsar sites in Turkey
Ahlat District
Tatvan District